Marconi may refer to:

Family name 
Enrico Marconi (1792-1863) was an Italian-Polish architect.
Guglielmo Marconi (1874–1937) was an Italian radio pioneer.
Leandro Marconi (1834-1919) was a Polish architect, son of Enrico.
Leonard Marconi (1835-1899) was a Polish architect and sculptor.
Rocco Marconi (1490–1529) was an Italian painter.
Władysław Marconi (1848-1915) was a Polish architect, son of Enrico.

Businesses
Marconi Company, a British telecommunications company; now part of General Electric Company (GEC)
Marconi Electronic Systems, the former defence arm of GEC
Marconi plc, the former telecommunications arm of GEC
Marconi Corporation plc, a British telecommunications company formed by the 2003 restructuring of Marconi plc
Marconi Communications, the former telecommunications arm of GEC, now part of Marconi Corporation plc
Marconi Instruments, a former British electronic instruments company
Telent, a successor company of Marconi plc
Alenia Marconi Systems, a former British-Italian defence electronics company
Matra Marconi Space, a former Franco-British aerospace company
Marconi Wireless Telegraph Company of America (1899–1919), a U.S. subsidiary of the parent British firm; now the Radio Corporation of America

Places
 Marconi (crater), a lunar impact crater
 Marconi National Historic Sites of Canada, Nova Scotia
 Marconi, California, United States

Metro stations in Italy
 Marconi (Brescia Metro)
 Marconi (Rome Metro)
 Marconi (Turin Metro)

Other uses
Marconi (mountain), Peru
Marconi (surname)
Marconi-class submarine, Italian class of submarine
Marconi University, Italy

See also
 Marconi scandal was a British political scandal that broke in mid-1912.
 Marconi Station, a list of wireless stations
 Marconi Wireless Station Site (disambiguation)
 
 Marconia (disambiguation)